Royal Air Force Boxted or more simply RAF Boxted is a former Royal Air Force station located  north-northeast of Colchester, Essex England.

Opened in 1943, it was used by the United States Army Air Forces (USAAF). RAF Boxted has the distinction of having been the airfield for the two most successful USAAF fighter groups in air-to-air combat. After the war it was used by the Royal Air Force for jet aircraft testing. It was closed in 1947.

Today the remains of the airfield are located on private property being used as agricultural fields.  It also has a small grass private airstrip and a museum which opened in 2011.

History

United States Army Air Forces use
The airfield was used by the United States Army Air Forces Eighth Air Force and Ninth Air Forces.  It was known as USAAF Station AAF-150 for security reasons by the USAAF during the war, and by which it was referred to instead of location.  Its USAAF Station Code was "BX".

USAAF Station Units assigned to RAF Boxted were: 
 33d Service Group (VIII Air Force Service Command)
 41st and 45th Service Squadron; HHS 33d Service Group
 15th Station Complement Squadron
 1030th Signal Company
 1126th Quartermaster Company
 1181st Military Police Company
 1631st Ordnance Supply & Maintenance Company
 2124th Engineer Fire Fighting Platoon
 589th Army Postal Unit

386th Bombardment Group (Medium)
Although Boxted was scheduled to receive the 96th Bombardment Group in June 1943, plans were changed and the Boeing B-17 Flying Fortress group went instead to RAF Snetterton Heath in Norfolk. In its place, the 386th Bombardment Group (Medium) was moved from Snetterton on 12 June to consolidate the Martin B-26 Marauder groups in Essex for operations.   The group was assigned to the VIII Bomber Command 3d Bomb Wing and flew both B-26B/C Marauder aircraft.  Its operational squadrons were:
 552d Bombardment Squadron (RG)
 553d Bombardment Squadron (AN)
 554th Bombardment Squadron (RU)
 555th Bombardment Squadron (YA)

The group flew its first mission on 20 July, with operations concentrating on airfields but also attacked marshalling yards and gun positions along the channel coast.

The group was transferred to RAF Great Dunmow on 24 September 1943.

354th Fighter Group

The 354th Fighter Group, was under the operational control of the VIII Fighter Command during its stay at Boxted, arriving from RAF Greenham Common on 13 November 1943 Its combat squadrons were:
 353d Fighter Squadron (FT)
 355th Fighter Squadron (GQ)
 356th Fighter Squadron (AJ)

The group provided long-range escort for US heavy bombers and received a Distinguished Unit Citation for its activities up to mid-May 1944 during which the 354th was instrumental in the development of the P-51 for use in long-range missions to escort heavy bombers on raids deep into enemy territory.

During that same period Colonel James H Howard won the Medal of Honor for his single-handed efforts to defend a bomber formation that was attacked by a large force of enemy planes while on a mission to Oschersleben, Germany on 11 January 1944.  Colonel Howard attacked a formation of thirty German aircraft pressing home the attack for more than thirty minutes he destroyed three aircraft and, even when he was low on fuel and his ammunition was exhausted, he continued his aggressive tactics to protect the bombers.

In mid-April 1944, the 354th flew south to RAF Lashenden in Kent prior to moving to the Continent after the invasion of Normandy.

56th Fighter Group

With the departure of the 354th, its place was taken by the 56th Fighter Group which was transferred from RAF Halesworth on 19 April 1944 to enable that base to be converted to a heavy bomber installation.  Its operational squadrons were:
 61st Fighter Squadron (HV)
 62d Fighter Squadron (LM)
 63d Fighter Squadron (UN)

Flying the Republic P-47 Thunderbolt, the 56th Fighter Group was the most successful of the Eighth Air Force groups in air-to-air combat, and the second most successful in the USAAF with 665.5 (the 354th FG had 701 while the Pacific-based 49th FG had 664).  It engaged in counter-air and interdictory missions during the invasion of Normandy in June 1944.  Supported Allied forces for the breakthrough at Saint-Lô in July and participated in the Battle of the Bulge, December 1944-January 1945. Helped to defend the Remagen bridgehead against air attacks in March 1945.

While at Boxted, the group received a Distinguished Unit Citation for strikes against antiaircraft positions while supporting the airborne attack on the Netherlands on 18 September 1944, an operation in which 16 P-47s were shot down or crashlanded in Allied territory.

The commander of the 61st FS, Lieutenant Colonel Francis Gabreski, destroyed his 28th enemy aircraft in air combat, a record unequalled by any American fighter pilot in Europe. On 20 July 1944, Gabreski had to make a belly landing in his P-47 Thunderbolt after his propeller clipped the ground while strafing an airfield near Koblenz, Germany.  Although he avoided capture for five days before being finally arrested and interrogated by the Germans, he was greeted with the words: 'Hello Gabby, we've been waiting for you for a long time!'

The 56th remained at Boxted until October when it returned to Camp Kilmer, New Jersey, being inactivated on 18 October 1945.

5th Emergency Rescue Squadron

Originally designated as Detachment B of the 65th Fighter Wing, the 5th Emergency Rescue Squadron was activated at Boxted in May 1944. The squadron's mission was to perform air/sea rescue missions with war weary Republic P-47 Thunderbolts transferred from other fighter groups.

The squadron's fuselage code was "5F".

The aircraft were modified to carry dinghies, marker buoys and flares on their bomb racks. The mission of the unit was to locate pilots who had bailed out over the North Sea and would drop liferafts and inform sea-based rescue units who would then pick up the pilots.

The unit moved to RAF Halesworth in January 1945.

Royal Air Force use
After the war, Boxted was taken over by RAF Fighter Command and used at first by de Havilland Mosquito night fighters and then, in 1946, by a Gloster Meteor jet squadron No. 234.  By the end 1946, the flying units had moved on and work had begun on resurfacing the main runway. It was closed on 9 August 1947.

The following units were also here at some point:
 No 1 Fighter Command Servicing Unit
 No. 25 Squadron RAF
 No. 56 Squadron RAF
 No. 145 Gliding School RAF
 No. 222 Squadron RAF
 No. 263 Squadron RAF
 No. 266 Squadron RAF

Current use
Only the outline of the airfield remains with single lane farm roads as the airfield has almost been completely returned to agriculture.  The control tower has been demolished, but a cluster of Nissen Huts remain on the south side of the airfield close to Langham Lodge . Two further refurbished Nissen Huts are present on the west of original airbase and house the Boxted Airfield Museum. A portion of the original main runway remains in use as a grass airstrip (04/22).

A memorial to the pilots and crews who flew from RAF Boxted is located on the northernmost end of the original runway where it meets Park Lane.

See also

List of former Royal Air Force stations

References

Citations

Bibliography
 Freeman, Roger A. (1978) Airfields of the Eighth: Then and Now. After the Battle 
 Freeman, Roger A. (1991) The Mighty Eighth: The Colour Record. Cassell 
 Maurer, Maurer (1983). Air Force Combat Units of World War II. Maxwell AFB, Alabama: Office of Air Force History. .
 mighty8thaf.preller.us Boxted
 56th Fighter Group on www.littlefriends.co.uk

External links

 Photographs of RAF Boxted from the Geograph British Isles project
  Boxted Airfield photo gallery
 Boxted Airfield historical group
 354th Fighter Group website
 Living with the "Wolf Pack"
 Boxted Fly-in 2006
 Heroes of the 354th Fighter Group (Video)

Royal Air Force stations in Essex
Airfields of the VIII Bomber Command in the United Kingdom
Military units and formations established in 1943
Military units and formations disestablished in 1947
Langham, Essex
Airfields of the United States Army Air Forces in Essex